Eupithecia orba is a moth in the family Geometridae. It is found in south-western China (Tibet).

The wingspan is about 16 mm. The fore- and hindwings are pale buff.

References

Moths described in 2004
orba
Moths of Asia